Javed Ilyas is a Pakistani former cricketer. He played twenty-eight first-class and two List A cricket matches between 1971/72 and 1985/86 for Multan and Punjab cricket teams.

Born on 25 April 1955, in a landowning family, his father was a government servant. He is a maternal uncle of Pakistani cricketer Inzamam-ul-Haq. 

He was educated at the Government College, Sahiwal and the Government College, Bosan Road, Multan.

References

Living people
1955 births
Multan cricketers
Punjab (Pakistan) cricketers
Cricketers from Multan
Pakistani cricketers